The Top10, known as the Peroni Top10 for sponsorship reasons, and formerly Top 12, is Italy's top level professional men's rugby union competition. The Top 10 is run by Federazione Italiana Rugby (FIR) and is contested by 10 teams as of the 2019–2020 season, following the Italian federation's decision to name Peroni as the official partner of the Top10 competition.

The leading teams qualify to play against teams from the other leading rugby union nations in Europe in the European Challenge Cup. Aironi and Benetton Treviso began competing in the league now known as Pro14 in the 2010–11 season, and took both Italian places in the Heineken Cup. Owing to financial problems, the FIR revoked Aironi's professional licence after the 2011–12 season; that team was replaced in Pro12 by the FIR-operated Zebre. From 2014 to 2015, one of the two Italian Pro12 sides competes in the Heineken Cup's replacement, the European Rugby Champions Cup; the other plays in the European Rugby Challenge Cup. Both Pro12 teams are intended to concentrate the best domestic talent and help develop the quality of Italian players and therefore improve the talent pool for the national team.

History

The competition was originally named Divisione Nazionale since its origin in 1928 until the 1945–46 season where the name of the National Championship was changed to the Serie A. Upon 1959, the competition's name was changed was changed to the Eccellenza before becoming the Serie A once again 26 years after in 1985. However, shortly after the name change, in 1986 the Serie A became the Serie A1 with the second tier taking the name of the Serie A2.

Since the 1987–88 season, the championship has been played under a play-off phase format after a regular season with the title being assigned through a final (several cities to have hosted finals include Padua, Bologna and Rome). After a major restructuring in 2001, the national championship was named Super 10 leaving the Serie A1 and Serie A2 to become the second and third divisions of Italian rugby respectively. Upon the 2009–10 season, the Super 10 championship which was founded (in 2001) and operated by the L.I.R.E. (Lega Italiana Rugby d'Eccellenza) (Italian Elite Rugby Union League in Italian) had folded in 2009, the Federazione Italiana Rugby (FIR) had taken over organising the championship.

The name of championship was changed once again to the Eccellenza for the 2010–11 season. After 8 years of the Eccellenza, the competition was increased to 12 teams and was rebranded as the Top12.

Upon the year 2010, the then known Celtic League (now the Pro14) had decided to expand their competition to 12 teams and add two Italian teams, one of them being Benetton Treviso (which would mean they would stop participating in the Super 10 and another being Aironi (a newly founded team that was later replaced by Zebre in the 2012–2013 season of the Pro 12 after folding due to financial reasons and having its license revoked by the Italian Rugby Federation).

The competition's name was changed from Top 12 to Top 10 in 2020 when teams I Medicei and San Donà withdrew their participation.

Current teams

{{location map+ |Italy |float=center |width=700|caption=Locations of teams in the 2022–23 Top10. (Teams marked with a green dot compete in the Pro14 league). |places=

See also
 Rugby union in Italy
 Italy national rugby union team
 European Rugby Champions Cup
 European Rugby Challenge Cup
 European Shield
 European Rugby Continental Shield
 Coppa Italia

References

External links
 Official site

 
Sports leagues established in 1929
Rugby union leagues in Europe
Rugby union leagues in Italy
1929 establishments in Italy
Italy